In aviation and aviation meteorology, a flight level (FL) is an aircraft's altitude at standard air pressure, expressed in hundreds of feet. The air pressure is computed assuming an International Standard Atmosphere pressure of 1013.25 hPa (29.92 inHg) at sea level, and therefore is not necessarily the same as the aircraft's actual altitude, either above sea level or above ground level.

Background
Flight levels are used to ensure safe vertical separation between aircraft, despite natural local variations in atmospheric air pressure. Historically, altitude has been measured using a pressure altimeter, which is essentially a calibrated barometer. An altimeter measures ambient air pressure, which decreases with increasing altitude following the barometric formula. It then calculates and displays the corresponding altitude. If different aircraft's altimeters were not calibrated consistently, then two aircraft could be flying at the same altitude even though their altimeters appeared to show that they were at different altitudes. Flight levels solve this problem by defining altitudes based on a standard air pressure at sea level. All aircraft operating on flight levels calibrate to this setting regardless of the actual sea level pressure.

To display true altitude above sea level, a pilot would need to calibrate the altimeter according to the local air pressure at sea level, to take into account natural variation of pressure over time and in different regions.

Definition 
Flight levels are described by a number, which is the nominal altitude, or pressure altitude, in hundreds of feet, while being a multiple of 500 ft, therefore always ending in 0 or 5.

In radio communications, FL290 would be pronounced as "flight level two nine(r) zero."

Transition altitude
While use of a standardised pressure setting facilitates separation of aircraft from each other, it does not provide the aircraft's actual height above ground. At low altitudes, the altimeter is commonly set to show the altitude above sea level, which can be directly compared to the known elevation of the terrain. The pressure setting to achieve this varies with weather conditions. It is called QNH ("barometric pressure adjusted to sea level"), or "altimeter setting", and the current local value is available from various sources, including air traffic control and the local METAR-issuing station.

The transition altitude (TA) is the altitude above sea level at which aircraft change from the use of local barometer derived altitudes to the use of flight levels. When operating at or below the TA, aircraft altimeters are usually set to show the altitude above sea level. Above the TA, the aircraft altimeter pressure setting is normally adjusted to the standard pressure setting of 1013.25 hectopascals (which is equivalent to millibars) or 29.92 inches of mercury and aircraft altitude will be expressed as a flight level.

There are discussions to standardize the transition altitude within the Eurocontrol area. In the United Kingdom, different airports have different transition altitudes, between 3000 and 6000 feet.

The transition level (TL) is the lowest flight level above the transition altitude. The table below shows the transition level according to transition altitude and QNH. When descending below the transition level, the pilot starts to refer to altitude of the aircraft by setting the altimeter to the QNH for the region or airfield.

The transition layer is the airspace between the transition altitude and the transition level.

Aircraft are not normally assigned to fly at the "'transition level'" as this would provide inadequate separation from traffic flying on QNH at the transition altitude. Instead, the lowest usable "'flight level'" is the transition level plus 500 ft.

However, in some countries, such as Norway for example, the transition level is determined by adding a buffer of minimum  (depending on QNH) to the transition altitude. Therefore, aircraft may be flying at both transition level and transition altitude, and still be vertically separated by at least .

In summary, the connection between "transition altitude" (TA), "transition layer" (TLYR), and "transition level" (TL) is

TL = TA + TLYR

Semicircular/hemispheric rule
The semicircular rule (also known as the hemispheric rule) applies, in slightly different version, to IFR flights in the UK inside controlled airspace and generally in the rest of the world.
The standard rule defines an East/West track split:

 Eastbound – Magnetic track 000 to 179° – odd thousands (FL 250, 270, etc.)
 Westbound – Magnetic track 180 to 359° – even thousands (FL 260, 280, etc.)

At FL 290 and above, if Reduced Vertical Separation Minima (RVSM) are not in use, 4,000 ft intervals are used to separate same-direction aircraft (instead of 2,000 ft intervals below FL 290), and only odd flight levels are assigned, independent of the direction of flight:
 Eastbound – Magnetic track 000 to 179° – odd flight levels (FL 290, 330, 370, etc.)
 Westbound – Magnetic track 180 to 359° – odd flight levels (FL 310, 350, 390, etc.)
Conversely, RVSM equipped aircraft are able to continue separation in 2,000 ft intervals as outlined in the semicircular rules. Both non-RVSM and RVSM equipped aircraft use a separation of 4,000 ft above FL 410. 

Countries where the major airways are oriented north/south (e.g., New Zealand; Italy; Portugal) have semicircular rules that define a North/South rather than an East/West track split.

In Italy, France, Portugal and recently also in Spain (AIP ENR 1.7-3), for example, southbound traffic uses odd flight levels; in New Zealand, southbound traffic uses even flight levels.
In Europe commonly used International Civil Aviation Organization (ICAO) separation levels are as per the following table:

Quadrantal rule
The quadrantal rule is defunct. It was used in the United Kingdom but was abolished in 2015 to bring the UK in line with the semi-circular rule used around the world.

The quadrantal rule applied to IFR flights in the UK both in and outside of controlled airspace except that such aircraft may be flown at a level other than required by this rule if flying in conformity with instructions given by an air traffic control unit, or if complying with notified en-route holding patterns or holding procedures notified in relation to an aerodrome. The rule affected only those aircraft operating under IFR when in level flight above 3,000 ft above mean sea level, or above the appropriate transition altitude, whichever is the higher, and when below FL195 (19,500 ft above the 1013.2 hPa datum in the UK, or with the altimeter set according to the system published by the competent authority in relation to the area over which the aircraft is flying if such aircraft is not flying over the UK.)

The rule was non-binding upon flights operating under visual flight rules (VFR).

Minimum vertical separation between two flights abiding by the UK Quadrantal Rule is 500 ft (note these are in geopotential foot units). The level to be flown is determined by the magnetic track of the aircraft, as follows:

 Magnetic track 000 to, and including, 089° – odd thousands of feet (FL070, 090, 110 etc.)
 Magnetic track 090 to, and including, 179° – odd thousands plus 500 ft (FL075, 095, 115 etc.)
 Magnetic track 180 to, and including, 269° – even thousands of feet (FL080, 100, 120 etc.)
 Magnetic track 270 to, and including, 359° – even thousands plus 500 ft (FL085, 105, 125 etc.)

Reduced vertical separation minima (RVSM)

Reduced vertical separation minima (RVSM) reduces the vertical separation above FL 290 to 1,000 ft. This allows aircraft to safely fly more optimum routes, gain fuel savings and increase airspace capacity by adding new flight levels. Only aircraft that have been certified to meet RVSM standards, with several exclusions, are allowed to fly in RVSM airspace. It was introduced into the UK in March 2001. On 20 January 2002, it entered European airspace. The United States, Canada and Mexico transitioned to RVSM between FL 290 and FL 410 on 20 January 2005, and Africa on 25 September 2008.

 Track 000 to 179° – odd thousands (FL 290, 310, 330, etc.)
 Track 180 to 359° – even thousands (FL 300, 320, 340, etc.)
At FL 410 and above, 4,000 ft intervals are resumed to separate same-direction aircraft and only odd Flight Levels are assigned, depending on the direction of flight:
 Track 000 to 179° – odd flight levels (FL 410, 450, 490, etc.)
 Track 180 to 359° – odd flight levels (FL 430, 470, 510, etc.)

Metric flight levels
The International Civil Aviation Organization (ICAO) has recommended a transition to using the International System of Units since 1979 with a recommendation on using metres (m) for reporting flight levels. China, Mongolia, Russia and many CIS countries have used flight levels specified in metres for years. Aircraft entering these areas normally make a slight climb or descent to adjust for this, although Russia and some CIS countries started using feet above transition altitude and introduced RVSM at the same time on 17 November 2011.

Kyrgyzstan, Kazakhstan, Tajikistan, Uzbekistan, and Turkmenistan 
The flight levels below apply to Kyrgyzstan, Kazakhstan, Tajikistan and Uzbekistan and 6,000 m or below in Turkmenistan (where feet is used for FL210 and above). Flight levels are read as e.g. "flight level 7,500 metres":

Track 180 to 359°
600 m (2,000 ft)
1,200 m (3,900 ft)
1,800 m (5,900 ft)
2,400 m (7,900 ft)
3,000 m (9,800 ft)
3,600 m (11,800 ft)
4,200 m (13,800 ft)
4,800 m (15,700 ft)
5,400 m (17,700 ft)
6,000 m (19,700 ft)
6,600 m (21,700 ft)
7,200 m (23,600 ft)
7,800 m (25,600 ft)
8,600 m (28,200 ft)
9,600 m (31,500 ft)
10,600 m (34,800 ft)
11,600 m (38,100 ft)
13,100 m (43,000 ft)
15,100 m (49,500 ft)
and every 2,000 metres thereafter.

Track 000 to 179°
900 m (3,000 ft)
1,500 m (4,900 ft)
2,100 m (6,900 ft)
2,700 m (8,900 ft)
3,300 m (10,800 ft)
3,900 m (12,800 ft)
4,500 m (14,800 ft)
5,100 m (16,700 ft)
5,700 m (18,700 ft)
6,300 m (20,700 ft)
6,900 m (22,600 ft)
7,500 m (24,600 ft)
8,100 m (26,600 ft)
9,100 m (29,900 ft)
10,100 m (33,100 ft)
11,100 m (36,400 ft)
12,100 m (39,700 ft)
14,100 m (46,300 ft)
and every 2,000 metres thereafter.

People's Republic of China and Mongolia
The flight levels below apply to Mongolia and People's Republic of China, not including Hong Kong. To distinguish flight levels in feet, flight levels are read without "flight level", e.g.
RVSM was implemented in China at 16:00 UTC on 21 November 2007, and in Mongolia at 00:01 UTC on 17 November 2011. Aircraft flying in feet according to the table below will have differences between the metric readout of the onboard avionics and ATC cleared flight level; however, the differences will never be more than thirty metres.

Track 180 to 359°
600 m (2,000 ft)
1,200 m (3,900 ft)
1,800 m (5,900 ft)
2,400 m (7,900 ft)
3,000 m (9,800 ft)
3,600 m (11,800 ft)
4,200 m (13,800 ft)
4,800 m (15,700 ft)
5,400 m (17,700 ft)
6,000 m (19,700 ft)
6,600 m (21,700 ft)
7,200 m (23,600 ft)
7,800 m (25,600 ft)
8,400 m (27,600 ft)
9,200 m (30,100 ft)
9,800 m (32,100 ft)
10,400 m (34,100 ft)
11,000 m (36,100 ft)
11,600 m (38,100 ft)
12,200 m (40,100 ft)
13,100 m (43,000 ft)
14,300 m (46,900 ft)
and every 1,200 metres thereafter.

Track 000 to 179°
900 m (3,000 ft)
1,500 m (4,900 ft)
2,100 m (6,900 ft)
2,700 m (8,900 ft)
3,300 m (10,800 ft)
3,900 m (12,800 ft)
4,500 m (14,800 ft)
5,100 m (16,700 ft)
5,700 m (18,700 ft)
6,300 m (20,700 ft)
6,900 m (22,600 ft)
7,500 m (24,600 ft)
8,100 m (26,600 ft)
8,900 m (29,100 ft)
9,500 m (31,100 ft)
10,100 m (33,100 ft)
10,700 m (35,100 ft)
11,300 m (37,100 ft)
11,900 m (39,100 ft)
12,500 m (41,100 ft)
13,700 m (44,900 ft)
14,900 m (48,900 ft)
and every 1,200 metres thereafter.

Flight levels in Russian Federation and North Korea
On 5 September 2011 the government of the Russian Federation issued decree №743, pertaining to the changes in the rules of use of the country's airspace. The new rules came into force on 17 November 2011, introducing a flight level system similar to the one used in the West. RVSM has also been in force since this date.

The following table is true for IFR flights:

Track 180 to 359°

Track 000 to 179°

The new system would eliminate the need to perform climbs and descents in order to enter or leave Russian airspace from or to jurisdictions following the Western standard.

From February 2017, Russia is changing to use QNH and Feet below the Transition Level. The first airport to use this is ULLI/St. Petersburg. Most other airports still use QFE.

Unlike Russia, North Korea usually uses metric system below TL based on QNH.

See also
 ICAO recommendations on use of the International System of Units
Flight planning
Gillham code

References

Altitudes in aviation
Air traffic control